Indira Gandhi Delhi Technical University for Women (IGDTUW), is an all women's university located in New Delhi, India on the heritage campus at Kashmere Gate, Delhi. It was founded as the Indira Gandhi Institute of Technology in 1998. In May 2013 it gained autonomy and became the first women's technical university in India established by Govt. of Delhi. The university offers BBA and BTech, MTech, and PhD programs in four branches of engineering i.e. in the field of Computer Science and Engineering, Electronics and Communication Engineering, Mechanical and Automation Engineering and Information Technology. The university also offers 5 years program in Bachelors of Architecture (B.Arch.) and a 2-year post graduate program in M. Plan (Urban Planning).

History

Indira Gandhi Institute of Technology was established by Department of Training and Technical Education, Govt. of Delhi, in 1998 as the first woman Engineering College in India. It was the first institute to become a constituent college of Guru Gobind Singh Indraprastha University. From May, 2013 IGIT has acquired the status of the first Women's technical University under Govt. of Delhi and rechristened as Indira Gandhi Delhi Technical University for Women.

Indira Gandhi Delhi Technical University for Women (IGDTUW) was established by the Govt. NCT of Delhi in May, 2013 vide Delhi Act 09 of 2012, as a non-affiliating University to facilitate and promote studies, research, technology, innovation, incubation and extension work in emerging areas of professional education among women, with focus on engineering, technology, applied sciences, architecture and its allied areas with the objective to achieve excellence in these and related fields.

Erstwhile Indira Gandhi Institute of Technology (IGIT) was established in 1998 by Directorate of Training and Technical Education, Govt. of NCT of Delhi as the first engineering college for women only. In 2002, the college became the first constituent college of Guru Gobind Singh Indraprastha University. Over the years erstwhile IGIT has significantly contributed to the growth of quality technical education in the country and has become not only one of the premier institutions of Delhi but as the most prestigious college of north India.

Administration
Dr. Nupur Prakash is the founder Vice-Chancellor of Indira Gandhi Delhi Technical University for Women established by Govt. of Delhi in 2013 as the first Women's Technical University. Dr.R.K. Singh holds the position of the Officiating Registrar of the university. Currently, Dr. Amita Dev is the Vice-chancellor of the university.

Departments 
The departments offering courses include:

Computer Science and Engineering
 Electronics and Communication Engineering
 Information Technology
 Mechanical and Automation Engineering
 Applied Sciences & Humanities
 Management
 Architecture and Planning
 Artificial intelligence & machine learning

Courses and admissions 
The university offers undergraduate Bachelor of Technology courses in four different fields i.e. Computer Science and Engineering(CSE), Electronics and Communication Engineering(ECE), Information Technology(IT), Mechanical and Automation Engineering(MAE). It also offers undergraduate Bachelor of Architecture (B.Arch.) course as well as postgraduate M. Plan (Urban Planning) and other postgraduate courses along with PhD.

Undergraduate Admissions 
For BTech courses students are selected through Joint Admission Counseling (JAC) (based on IITJEE MAINS rank).
JAC DELHI members are
1. Delhi Technological University
2. Netaji Subhas University of Technology  
3. Indraprastha Institute of Information Technology Delhi (IIIT,Delhi)
4. Indira Gandhi Delhi Technical University for Women,(IGDTUW).

Postgraduate Admissions 

For M.Tech. and M. Plan courses the students are admitted based on valid GATE scores making them eligible for a monthly GATE Scholarship. The PhD admission is based on entrance test and interview.

Scholarships and Financial Aid 
IGDTUW offers scholarship to all GATE qualified M. Tech/M. Plan students and few Full Time Research Scholars registered in the PhD Program under various Fellowship Schemes and Sponsored Research Projects. Fellowships are granted to candidates who qualify the RAT examination and an Interview. The number of fellowships are limited and is subject to availability of financial assistance.

Rankings

The National Institutional Ranking Framework (NIRF) ranked it 177 among engineering colleges in 2022.

Facilities  
The University Campus has an auditorium, a Library, sporting facilities, academic laboratories, a dispensary, Computer Centre, a bank and a guest house. The university campus offers a common room for students which is equipped with fitness equipments, yoga facility and indoor games.

Library cum Learning Resource Centre (LRC)

Learning Resource Centre (LRC) serves as the premier source of academic information for the IGDTUW community through its collections, educational and consulting services. The LRC has a highly selective collection of print, electronic, and audiovisual materials in the areas of science, engineering, technology and management to support the learning and research activities of students and faculty. A number of e- journals are being subscribed through consortia mode subscription. All these journals are available online to the member of the LRC in campus LAN. The Digital Library section has e-materials like CDs, DVDs and digital thesis of final year students and are available through an Open Source Institution Repository Software within the campus premises.

Issue/ Return Timing: 9:15 AM to 5:00 PM (Monday to Friday)

Lunch Break: 1:45 PM to 2:20 PM

For Weekend Students: 10 AM to 4 PM (Saturday and Sunday)

Library is closed on University Holidays.

Computer Center

The university has on campus computing facility (computer lab) housed in centralized air conditioned premises. Computer Center at the university is equipped with the newly procured Computer Systems with a high end configuration for the students of the institute.

Dispensary

The dispensary is equipped with over the counter medications, bed to rest in, medical equipments, physical screening tools and first aid supplies. A team of one registered medical practitioner along with one registered nurse is available from 09: 00 am to 05: 00 pm.

Bank

The Punjab and Sind bank is available in the university premises.

Opening Hours (Lunch Break: 2pm to 2: 30pm): -

Monday to Friday: 10 am to 4pm.

Saturday: 10 am to 1pm.

Guest House

The guest house within the campus has limited accommodation for the staying purpose of parents/individuals visiting the campus. The rooms are comfortable with all modern facilities available within at nominal charges.

Residential student halls 
The university campus has two hostel wings - Krishna Hostel and Kaveri Hostel, to accommodate approximately 340 students. These two hostels are located in the university campus. These hostels provide a safe, secure and clean environment for the students to grow, learn and mature in the society away from their own homes. The hostel authorities always facilitate to create an environment for the students to study, do well in their academics and focus on their career and future. All rooms are on twin/triple sharing basis and are equipped with individual beds, chairs, built-in cupboards and study tables.

Student Life and Culture 
Taarangana is the cultural fest of IGDTUW and was held for the first time on 31 January - 1 February 2014. It is organised henceforth every year in January ending or February starting. Innerve is the annual technical fest of All the Technical Departments of IGDTUW. It is organised every year in October. Entrepreneurship Summit is a two-day event which celebrates the spirit of entrepreneurship by bringing various stakeholders of entrepreneurial ecosystem under one roof. It is organized by EDC every year in March. Other fests organised by IGDTUW include Espectro, Impulse, Tremors, Exebec.

IGDTUW has clubs for extra-curricular activities such as Technoliterati-The Literary Society, Antargat- the Creative Society for waste management practices, The Economics Society, Greensphere- The Environmental Society, Tarannum- the Music Society, ZENA- The fashion society, RAHNUMA-Dramatics Society, HYPNOTICS –Dance Society, SOCH - The Art Society  The students also participate in national competitions like Baja SAE India, Supra SAE India among others gaining practical exposure to their engineering course.

Notable alumni
 Durga Shakti Nagpal, Indian Administrative Service

References

1998 establishments in Delhi
All India Council for Technical Education
Colleges of the Guru Gobind Singh Indraprastha University
Education in Delhi
Educational institutions established in 1998
Engineering colleges in Delhi
Women's engineering colleges in India
Women's universities and colleges in Delhi
Monuments and memorials to Indira Gandhi